Jannik Sinner defeated Alex de Minaur in the final, 4–2, 4–1, 4–2 to win the 2019 Next Generation ATP Finals.

Stefanos Tsitsipas was the defending champion, but withdrew as he had qualified for the ATP Finals.

The 2019 edition was a men's exhibition tennis tournament played in Milan, Italy, from 5 to 9 November 2019. It was the season-ending event for the best singles players that were age 21 and under on the 2019 ATP Tour. This was the first year that it was played at the PalaLido Allianz Cloud, after two years at Fiera Milano.

Prize money

 Undefeated champion | $429,000

Qualified players
In September, during the US Open, defending champion Stefanos Tsitsipas became the first player to qualify. In October, he announced his withdrawal, having qualified for the 2019 ATP Finals.

On 16 September, Jannik Sinner was announced as the Italian wild card. 

On 9 October, Félix Auger-Aliassime became the second player to qualify.

On 16 October, Alex de Minaur qualified for the second consecutive year, having been the runner-up in 2018.

Between 21 and 23 of October, Frances Tiafoe, Casper Ruud, Miomir Kecmanović and Ugo Humbert all qualified. Mikael Ymer then qualified the following day after Felix Auger-Aliassime withdrew due to injury. Denis Shapovalov also withdrew on 1 November, which meant Alejandro Davidovich Fokina qualified.

Qualification

The top seven players in the ATP Race to Milan qualified. The eighth spot was reserved for an Italian wild card, as in the past two editions. Eligible players had to be 21 or under at the start of the year (born in 1998 or later for 2019 edition).

Results

Final 
   Jannik Sinner def.  Alex de Minaur, 4–2, 4–1, 4–2

Seeds

Draw

Finals

Group A

Group B

Standings are determined by: 1. number of wins; 2. number of matches; 3. in two-players-ties, head-to-head records; 4. in three-players-ties, percentage of sets won, then percentage of games won, then head-to-head records; 5. ATP rankings.

References

2019
2019 ATP Tour
2019 Next Generation ATP Finals
2019 in Italian tennis
Sports competitions in Milan
2010s in Milan
2019 tennis exhibitions
Next Generation